Phillip Grenville Mann (24 December 1921 – 19 June 1990) was an Australian actor, playwright, stage director and manager, and writer.

He won a series of prizes as a young writer. He served in the Royal Australian Navy.

He worked for six years in London. He became a staff writer at the ABC. He replaced Rex Rienits as drama editor at the ABC.

Select writings
The Seas between (1946) – radio play starring Peter Finch
Dear Enemy (July 1951) – radio play
The Cat Scratches (1954) - radio play
Theatre Royal episode "Dead or Alive" (1956) – TV play – became Funnel Web
Shadow Squad (1958) – TV series – various episodes
The Verdict is Yours (1958) – TV series – various episodes
The Probation Officer (1960) – TV series
The Attorney General (1961) – TV play
The Sergeant from Burralee (1961) – TV play
The Patriots (1962) – TV series
Funnel Web (1962) – TV play
Ballad for One Gun''' (1963) – TV playDay of Glory (1964) – playLuther (1964) – TV play – adaptation of the play by John OsborneThe Keys of Heaven (1966) (novel)The Red Gardenia (1966) - radio play starring Ron HaddrickUndercover (1968) - radio play starring Richard MeikleCertain Women (1971) – TV seriesEight Days a Week (1972) – playCandles in the Sun (1978) – novelHow Sleep the Brave (1979) – playOver to Mother'' – a play

References

External links

Phillip Grenville Mann at AustLit
Phillip Grenville Mann theatre credits at AusStage

1921 births
1990 deaths
Australian dramatists and playwrights
Australian expatriates in the United Kingdom